Karin Margareta Wilhelmson, née Nordh (born January 4, 1933 in Nyköping; died August 12, 2018 in Stockholm) was a Swedish journalist and radio producer.

Career 
Wilhelmson worked as a daily press journalist from 1950, since 1960 as a producer at Sveriges Radio. She was a member of TV1's program council from 1973 to 1978.

Together with Monica Boëthius and Birgitta Rembe, she was a member of the Family Mirror in the 1960s. Wilhelmson led the Sommar radio program on August 22, 1968 and August 6, 1970.

Personal life 
In 1953, she married Anders Wilhelmson. They had three children.

References

1933 births
2018 deaths
People from Nyköping Municipality
Swedish women journalists
21st-century Swedish journalists
Swedish radio presenters
Swedish women radio presenters